Misato (written:  or ) is a feminine Japanese given name. Notable people with the name include:

, Japanese badminton player
, Japanese voice actress
, Japanese ice dancer
, Japanese Paralympic athlete
, Japanese judoka
, Japanese actress
, Japanese announcer
, Japanese singer

Fictional characters
, a character in the anime series Neon Genesis Evangelion
 Misato Tachibana, a character from the anime and manga series Nichijou

Japanese feminine given names